Valkaria Airport  is a public-use airport located  west of the central business district of the city of Grant-Valkaria in Brevard County, Florida, United States. The airport is publicly owned.

The airport was originally constructed by the U.S. Navy during World War II as Naval Outlying Landing Field Valkaria (NOLF Valkaria), an auxiliary airfield to Naval Air Station Melbourne, now Melbourne International Airport. NOLF Valkaria was closed in late 1945 and did not reopen for flight operations until 1959. During the 1950s, 1960s and 1970s, the site was used as a Missile Trajectory Measurement (MISTRAM) station by the U.S. Air Force and NASA in support of launch operations at Cape Canaveral Air Force Station and Kennedy Space Center.

In 1959, the United States Department of Defense and the General Services Administration conveyed that part of the Valkaria facility not dedicated to MISTRAM to the county government of Brevard County, Florida for use as a public airport.

The Valkaria Airport also has the Space Coast Drone Test Center.

References

External links

Airports in Brevard County, Florida
1940s establishments in Florida
Closed installations of the United States Navy